Mohamed Lamine may refer to:

Muhammad VIII al-Amin (1881–1962), the last bey of Tunisia (1943 to 1956)
Mohamed Lamine (singer), Algerian raï singer contributing to the Raï'n'B album series
Mohamed Lamine Chakhari (born 1957), Tunisian politician and minister 
Mohamed Lamine Debaghine (1917-2003), Algerian politician and independence activist
Mohamed Lamine Ould Ahmed (born 1946), Sahrawi politician and a member of the Polisario Front
Mohamed Lamine Sanha (died 2007), Bissau-Guinean Naval Chief of Staff
Mohamed Lamine Sissoko (born 1985), French-born Malian football player 
Mohamed Lamine Traoré (also known as Mamadou Lamine Traoré) (1947–2007), Malian politician
Mohamed Lamine Zemmamouche (born 1985), Algerian football player